The 1986 Brit Awards were the 6th edition of the biggest annual pop music awards in the United Kingdom. They are run by the British Phonographic Industry and took place on 10 February 1986 at Grosvenor House Hotel in London. This year marked the first presentation of the International Group and International Solo Artist awards.

The awards ceremony, hosted by Noel Edmonds, was televised by the BBC.

Performances
 Huey Lewis and the News – "The Power of Love"
 Kate Bush – "Hounds of Love"
 Phil Collins – "One More Night"
 Tears for Fears – "Everybody Wants to Rule the World"

Winners and nominees

Multiple nominations and awards
The following artists received multiple awards and/or nominations. don't counting Outstanding Contribution to Music.

References

External links
1986 Brit Awards at Brits.co.uk

Brit Awards
Brit Awards
BRIT Awards
BRIT Awards
Brit Awards
Brit Awards